Ghanta Ghar Chowk is a place in Multan, the fifth-largest city in  Pakistan, which literally means "Clock Tower Town Square" in Urdu.

It is the largest intersection in Multan, near the clock tower of the city called Ghanta Ghar (Multan). The largest diameter of this circular intersection is 127 metres (415 feet), while its minimum diameter is 94.5 metres (310 feet). It has five lanes. This chowk is regarded as the centre of Multan. It is the location for many city activities.

It has a newly built mosque in the center named Masjid Allah Wali.

The major arteries (larger roads) arising from this chowk are:
 Bakar Mandi Road
 Qilla Kohna Qasim Bagh Road
 Abdali Road
 Alang Road of Lohari Gate
 Hussain Agahi Bazar Road
 Kachehri Road
 Water Works Road

See also
Ghanta Ghar (Multan)

External links
 

Squares in Pakistan
Monuments and memorials in Punjab, Pakistan
Transport in Multan